Rudolf Sabetzer (28 July 1934 – 25 July 1983) was an Austrian football midfielder who played for Austria. He also played for SC Schwechat, FK Austria Wien, Linzer ASK and SC Wacker Wien.

External links

 
 

1934 births
1983 deaths
Austrian footballers
Austria international footballers
Association football midfielders
FK Austria Wien players
LASK players
FC Admira Wacker Mödling players
Austrian football managers
Floridsdorfer AC managers